The Katowice urban area, also known as the Upper Silesian urban area, is an urban area/conurbation in southern Poland, centered on Katowice.  It is located in the Silesian Voivodeship and in a small part of the Lesser Poland Voivodeship. The Katowice urban area is the largest urban area in Poland and one of the largest in the European Union.

Its population is about 2.7 million. The Katowice urban area covers the majority of the population and area of the Katowice metropolitan area (a population of between 3 million and 3.5 million) and is part of the Upper Silesian metropolitan area, which has a population of 5,294,000 people. Also this is part of Upper Silesian metropolitan region (Katowice-Kraków metropolitan region), which has a population of about 7 million with among others Kraków metropolitan area.

Alternative names
. 
.

Statistics
There are given differing population numbers in different sources.

 1,726,000 – according to Demographia (April 2020). Labeled as 21st largest urban area in the European Union.
 2,700,000 – according to Metropolis.pl
 2,746,000 – according to the scientific description by Tadeusz Markowski.
 2,733,000 (2,928,000 – counting the whole powiats adjacent to the city) – according to the scientific description by Paweł Swianiewicz and Urszula Klimska.
 2,775,000 – according to citypopulation.de.
 2,764,971 – number of inhabitants resident in 42 adjacent cities and towns in the conurbation, in an area of 2,411 km2, population density:  (1 January 2008) – on the basis of data from the Central Statistical Office in Poland.
 2,746,460 – according to the Eurostat. Markered as 13th largest urban zone in Europe. 
 2,886,700 – according to the scientific description by Kazimierz Fiedorowicz and Jacek Fiedorowicz.
 3,029,000 – according to the European Spatial Planning Observation Network. Markered as 13th largest metropolitan area in European Union and also 6th polycentric metropolitan area in EU.
 3,069,000 – according to the United Nations.
 3,239,200 – according to the Ministry of Regional Development of Poland
 3,450,141 – according to Eurostat
 3,488,000 – according to www.worldatlas.com.
 3,500,000 – according to PWN Encyclopedia.
 3,500,000 – according to the scientific description by Jerzy Parysek and Alexander Tölle.

Administration of urban area

Adjacent cities and statistics (1 January 2008):

See also
Upper Silesian Metropolitan Union
Upper Silesian Industrial Region
Upper Silesian Coal Basin

References

Katowice
Geography of Silesian Voivodeship
Metropolitan areas of Poland
Demographics of Poland
Upper Silesia

es:Área urbana de Silesia Superior